Manifesta, also known as the European Nomadic Biennial, is a European pan-regional contemporary cultural biennale.

History 
Manifesta was founded in 1994 by Dutch art historian Hedwig Fijen. The first edition took place in Rotterdam. One of the coordinators in Rotterdam was Thomas Meyer zu Schlochtern of the Rotterdamse Kunststichting. Among the local artists brought into the international scene, were Jeanne van Heeswijk, Bik Van Der Pol, and Joep van Lieshout.

The 2006 edition of Manifesta was set to happen in Nicosia, Cyprus, under the direction of Florian Waldvogel, Mai Abu ElDahab, and Anton Vidokle. In June 2006, Nicosia for Art, the city-run nonprofit organization sponsoring the exhibition, cancelled the event due to political turmoil around the green line of Nicosia.

Previous editions have taken place in Rotterdam (1996), Luxembourg (1998), Ljubljana (2000), Frankfurt (2002), San Sebastián (2004), Nicosia (2006 – cancelled), Trentino-Alto Adige/Südtirol (2008), Murcia in dialogue with northern Africa (2010), Limburg (2012), Saint Petersburg (2014), Zürich (2016), Palermo (2018), and Marseille (2020 – known as Manifesta 13, it took place despite the COVID-19 pandemic). In 2022, Manifesta is being hosted by Pristina, followed by Barcelona in 2024, and Ruhr in 2026.

The 10th edition of Manifesta in Saint Petersburg in Russia created tensions as the government had just prohibited "gay propaganda".

The 12th edition of Manifesta was held in Palermo, Italy, around the theme "The Planetary Garden. Cultivating Coexistence". The exhibition put forward an interpretation of the city's history as the expression of a syncretism of cultures across the Mediterranean. The curators used the idea of the garden as a metaphor on how it might be possible to aggregate differences and to compose life out of movement and migration.

After the cancellation of Manifesta 13 (planned to have been held in Marseille) due to Covid19, Manifesta 14 was held in Pristina, Kosovo, in 2022.

Education 
Manifesta's Education and Mediation programme is a part of each Manifesta Biennial. The education team is among the first to begin developing programmes in Manifesta's host cities. The programmes created by the team are derived from conversations, extensive field research and sociocultural and educational mapping.

The programme is developed collaboratively with artists and associations of the host city and includes projects that are educational, curatorial, artistic, research-based, and accessible to everyone. The education team is responsible for developing a discursive mediation and a critical perspective on the curatorial project. Additionally the team creates a set of interrelated research-and-practice-based programmes focussed on local knowledge and practices.

Editions

Ownership 
The Manifesta Biennial is owned and organized by Amsterdam-based International Foundation Manifesta (IFM).

References

Further reading

External links

 

Art biennials
International festivals
Festivals in the Netherlands
Festivals in Slovenia
Festivals in Germany
Festivals in Spain
Festivals in Cyprus
Festivals in Belgium
Festivals in Luxembourg
Festivals in Russia
Festivals in Switzerland
Art festivals in Italy
Recurring events established in 1996